Francis J. Lynch (August 9, 1920 – May 31, 1993) was an American politician from Pennsylvania who served as a Democratic member of the Pennsylvania State Senate for the 2nd district from 1973 to 1993.

Early life
Lynch was born in Philadelphia, Pennsylvania and attended the Roman Catholic School, Banks Business College and St. John's Night School.  He served in the U.S. Army during World War II and was awarded the Purple Heart for wounds received during combat in France.

Career
He was first elected to the Pennsylvania House of Representatives in 1966. He was first elected to represent the 2nd senatorial district in the Pennsylvania Senate in a 1973 special election. Shortly before he died, he left his hospital bed to cast a tie breaking vote on the budget.  His death left the Pennsylvania Senate locked in a 24–24 tie.

He died on May 31, 1993 and is interred at Resurrection Cemetery in Bensalem, Pennsylvania.

References

1920 births
1993 deaths
United States Army personnel of World War II
Burials in Pennsylvania
Democratic Party members of the Pennsylvania House of Representatives
Military personnel from Philadelphia
Democratic Party Pennsylvania state senators
Politicians from Philadelphia
20th-century American politicians